Hoodwink is a 1981 Australian thriller film directed by Claude Whatham and written by Ken Quinnell. It stars John Hargreaves and Judy Davis with Geoffrey Rush in his feature film debut. The film is based on the true story of a well-publicised Australian con artist. It was nominated for eight Australian Film Institute Awards, with Davis winning the Award for Best Actress in a Supporting Role.

Plot
Martin Stang, a bank robber (Hargreaves) finds himself behind bars and decides to pursue another con job; his escape. He does this by attempting to convince prison authorities that he is blind and no longer poses a threat to society. Along his journey he befriends a sexually-repressed clergyman's wife, Sarah (Davis). The pair become intimate during Martin's day release but his con is complicated when he reveals to Sarah that he is not in fact blind.

Cast
John Hargreaves as Martin Stang
Judy Davis as Sarah
Dennis Miller as Ralph
Wendy Hughes as Lucy
Max Cullen as Buster
Paul Chubb as Reid
Wendy Strehlow as Martin's sister
Michael Caton as Shapley
Colin Friels as Robert
Geoffrey Rush as Detective 1
Lex Marinos as Detective 2
John Pear as Eye Specialist
Dasha Blahova as Eye Specialist's Wife

Production
The film is based on the true story of Carl Synnerdahl, a convict who posed as a blind man to get a lighter sentence and had been forced to keep up the deception. He told his story to literary agent Rosemary Cresswell, who was doing some work for the Department of Corrective Services, who in turn told the story to producer Errol Sullivan. Several directors were approached to make the movie but turned it down, including Bruce Beresford, Michael Thornhill, Phillip Noyce and Esben Storm. Eventually British director Claude Whatham was imported, which was highly controversial because the movie was made with funds from the Australian tax payer.

Release
The film was not a large success at the box office. However Carl Synnerdahl was released from prison on Errol Sullivan's bond after serving 21 years in prison and he remarried and had three children.

Awards and nominations
Australian Film Institute Awards

Australian Film Institute Award for Best Actress in a Supporting Role – Judy Davis (won)
Australian Film Institute Award for Best Actor in a Leading Role – John Hargreaves
Australian Film Institute Award for Best Actor in a Supporting Role – Max Cullen
Australian Film Institute Award for Best Direction – Claude Whatham
Australian Film Institute Award for Best Screenplay, Original or Adapted – Ken Quinnell
Australian Film Institute Award for Best Achievement in Editing – Nicholas Beauman
Australian Film Institute Award for Best Costume Design – Ross Major
Australian Film Institute Award for Best Achievement in Sound – Gary Wilkins/Andrew Steuart/Peter Fenton

References

External links
 
Hoodwink at Oz Movies
 

1981 films
Films shot in Australia
Thriller films based on actual events
Crime films based on actual events
Australian thriller films
1980s English-language films
Films directed by Claude Whatham